Self-Censorship is a 2017 Taiwanese documentary film directed by filmmaker Kevin H.J. Lee. It explores how Beijing limits freedom of expression in Hong Kong and Taiwan.

References

2017 films
Taiwanese documentary films